Tirukkural, also known as the Kural, is considered one of the most widely translated non-religious works in the world. As of 2020, the work has been translated into about 41 world languages. As of 2014, English language alone had about 57 versions available, which is estimated to have crossed 100 by 2020.

Table of available translations

Alphabetically
 Arabic: Tirukkural translations into Arabic
 Bengali: Tirukkural translations into Bengali
 Chinese: Tirukkural translations into Chinese
 Czech: Tirukkural translations into Czech
 Dutch: Tirukkural translations into Dutch
 English: Tirukkural translations into English
 Fijian: Tirukkural translations into Fijian
 Finnish: Tirukkural translations into Finnish
 French: Tirukkural translations into French
 German: Tirukkural translations into German
 Gujarati: Tirukkural translations into Gujarati
 Hindi: Tirukkural translations into Hindi
 Japanese: Tirukkural translations into Japanese
 Kannada: Tirukkural translations into Kannada
 Konkani language: Tirukkkural translations into Konkani
 Korean language: Tirukkural translations into Korean
 Latin: Tirukkural translations into Latin
 Malay: Tirukkural translations into Malay
 Malayalam: Tirukkural translations into Malayalam
 Marathi: Tirukkural translations into Marathi
 Odia: Tirukkural translations into Odia
 Polish: Tirukkural translations into Polish
 Punjabi: Tirukkural translations into Punjabi
 Rajasthani: Tirukkural translations into Rajasthani
 Russian: Tirukkural translations into Russian
 Sanskrit: Tirukkural translations into Sanskrit
 Saurashtra: Tirukkural translations into Saurashtra
 Sinhalese: Tirukkural translations into Sinhalese
 Swedish: Tirukkural translations into Swedish
 Telugu: Tirukkural translations into Telugu
 Urdu: Tirukkural translations into Urdu

See also

 Tirukkural translations
 :Category:Tirukkural translators

References

Tirukkural